Kryukovo may refer to:
Kryukovo District, a district in Zelenograd Administrative Okrug of Moscow, Russia
Staroye Kryukovo District, a district in Zelenograd Administrative Okrug of Moscow, Russia
Kryukovo railway station, main railway station in Zelenograd Administrative Okrug of Moscow, Russia
Kryukovo, name of several rural localities in Russia